Moment to Moment is a 1966 American neo noir psychological thriller film directed by Mervyn LeRoy and starring Jean Seberg, Honor Blackman and Sean Garrison.

Plot
Kay Stanton lives on the French Riviera with her psychiatrist husband Neil Stanton and son Tommy. One day while Neil is away, Kay meets American naval ensign Mark, and they begin an affair. Kay realizes that she does love her husband and tries to break off the relationship. While arguing with Mark, Kay accidentally shoots him. With the help of her friend Daphne, she dumps his body into a ravine, then calls the police anonymously to tell them of its location.

Later, Neil gets a request from the police to help an amnesiac victim recovering from a gunshot wound. The man is revealed to be Mark, who manages to regain his memory but does not betray Kay. Neil realizes the truth as well, but is certain that his wife really loves him.

Cast
 Jean Seberg as Kay Stanton
 Honor Blackman as Daphne Fields
 Sean Garrison as Mark Dominic
 Arthur Hill as Neil Stanton
 Grégoire Aslan as Insp. DeFargo
 Peter Robbins as Timmy Stanton
 Donald Woods as Mr. Singer
 Walter Reed as Hendricks
 Albert Carrier as Travel Agent
 Lomax Study as Albie
 Richard Angarola as Givet
 Georgette Anys as Louise

Production
The film was based on a story by Alec Coppel that had been purchased by Mervyn LeRoy, who described the film as a "woman's picture."

LeRoy faced difficulty casting the lead roles because "... it's so hard to find actresses who really look like ladies." Jean Seberg was selected for the part of Kay, and she had not acted in a Hollywood film for several years. Other candidates for the role included Grace Kelly, Audrey Hepburn and Julie Andrews.

Honor Blackman was cast on the basis of her success in Goldfinger. "If I'm ever to make an international name, now is the time to cash in on it," said Blackman. Arthur Hill was cast after his recent Broadway success in Who's Afraid of Virginia Woolf?. Sean Garrison had just toured around the country in a production of Camelot and signed long-term contracts with LeRoy and Universal. LeRoy felt it was difficult to cast the male roles, saying, "There are few young men who really look manly."

Shooting took place partly on location in the South of France in Nice, Mougins, Cannes and Saint-Paul-de-Vence, but most filming occurred at Universal Pictures on a $350,000 set designed to look like the French Riviera. Costumes were provided by Yves Saint Laurent.

The film's title song was written by Henry Mancini and Johnny Mercer.

See also
List of American films of 1966

References

External links
 
 
 

1966 films
1960s thriller drama films
1960s psychological thriller films
Adultery in films
American thriller drama films
American psychological thriller films
Films based on short fiction
Films directed by Mervyn LeRoy
Films scored by Henry Mancini
Films set in France
Films shot in France
Universal Pictures films
1966 drama films
1960s English-language films
1960s American films